Lewis Ralph Jones (December 5, 1864 – April 1, 1945) was an American botanist and agricultural biologist.

Jones was born in Brandon, Wisconsin. He was a professor of plant pathology from 1904 to 1935 at the University of Wisconsin. Jones died in Orlando, Florida.

Family
Jones' second wife was Anna May Clark, a fellow botanist.

References

External links

Biography by the National Academy of Science (PDF)

1864 births
1945 deaths
People from Brandon, Wisconsin
University of Michigan alumni
American botanists
American phytopathologists